People in Conflict was an afternoon program that appeared on CTV Television Network every weekday from October 1, 1962 through September 11, 1970. It ran for half an hour and covered two different stories of real people suffering from emotional crises. It was originally produced in the Vancouver CTV affiliate CHAN-TV but was moved to Montreal's CFCF-TV in the late 1960s to take advantage of the new colour television cameras.
The show was later produced in Australia by John Pond and Channel 7.

References 
 People in Conflict. TVArchive.ca. Retrieved May 21, 2009.

1960s Canadian documentary television series
CTV Television Network original programming
1962 Canadian television series debuts
1970 Canadian television series endings
1970s Canadian documentary television series